Hang-e Zhaleh (also Romanized as Hang-e Zhāleh and Hangzhālah; also known as Hangeh Zhāleh, Hangzāla, and Hangzāleh) is a village in Kumasi Rural District, in the Central District of Marivan County, Kurdistan Province, Iran. At the 2006 census, its population was 63, in 17 families. The village is populated by Kurds.

References 

Towns and villages in Marivan County
Kurdish settlements in Kurdistan Province